The radio stations operated by Spanish Broadcasting System and their programming formats are:

Being Sold to SBS

Current

Orlando
WPYO El Zol 95 (Spanish Tropical)

Tampa
WSUN (FM) El Zol 97 (Spanish Tropical)

Los Angeles
KLAX-FM 97.9 La Raza HD1 (Regional Mexican)/Raza Clásicos 97.9 HD2 (Regional Mexican Oldies)
KXOL-FM La Mega 96.3 HD1 (pop)/El Zol 96.3 HD2 (Spanish Tropical)

New York
WSKQ-FM La Mega 97.9 HD1 (Spanish Tropical)/One Caribbean Radio 97.9 HD2 (Caribbean music)
WPAT-FM 93.1 Amor HD1 (Spanish Tropical & Spanish Adult Contemporary)/La Nueva 93.1 HD2 (Spanish Christian music)

Puerto Rico
WMEG La Mega 106.9 (CHR – Latin/American Top 40)
WEGM La Mega 95.1 (CHR – Latin/American Top 40)
WRXD Estereotempo 96.5 (Adult contemporary)
WNVI Estereotempo 1040 (Adult contemporary) (owned by Aurio A. Matos Barreto)
WZNT Zeta 93.7 (Salsa)
WZMT Zeta 93.3 (Salsa)
WIOB Zeta 97.5 (Salsa)
WODA La Nueva 94.7 (Urban)
WNOD La Nueva 94.1 (Urban)

Chicago
WLEY-FM La Ley 107.9 (Regional Mexican)

Miami
WXDJ El Zol 106.7 (Spanish Tropical)
WCMQ-FM Zeta 92.3 (Salsa / Adult Contemporary)
WRMA Ritmo 95.7 (Cubatón)
WRAZ-FM Salsa 106.3 (Salsa) (owned by South Broadcasting System)
WMFM El Zol 107.9 (Spanish Tropical) (owned by South Broadcasting System)

San Francisco
KRZZ 93.3 La Raza (Regional Mexican)

Former

Puerto Rico
 WIOA 99.9 FM (San Juan, now owned by International Broadcasting Corporation)
 WIOC 105.1 FM (Ponce, now owned by International Broadcasting Corporation)
 WZET 92.1 FM (Hormigueros, now owned by International Broadcasting Corporation)

Los Angeles
 KZAB 93.5 FM (Now owned by Meruelo Radio Holdings)
 KXMG 1540 AM (Now owned by P&Y Broadcasting Corporation)

New York
 WXLX 620 AM (Now owned by Davidson Radio, Inc)

San Francisco
 KBTB 92.7 FM (Now owned by Golden State Broadcasting, LLC)

Chicago
WKIE 92.7 FM (Now owned by Newsweb Corporation)
WKIF 92.7 FM (Now owned by Milner Media Partners, LLC)
WDEK 92.5 FM (Now owned by Educational Media Foundation)
Spanish Broadcasting System radio stations
Spain